Haplocochlias moolenbeeki is a species of sea snail, a marine gastropod mollusk in the family Skeneidae.

Description
The height of the shell attains 4.7 mm.

Distribution
This marine species occurs off Colombia; the ABC Islands: Aruba, Curaçao.

References

External links
 To Encyclopedia of Life
 To World Register of Marine Species
 De Jong K.M. & Coomans H.E. (1988) Marine gastropods from Curaçao, Aruba and Bonaire. Leiden: E.J. Brill. 261 pp. 

moolenbeeki
Gastropods described in 1988